The Casa de Parley Johnson is a historic house in Downey, California, U.S.. It was built for Alexander Parley Johnson, an heir to citrus fields, real estate and oil investments, in 1927. It was designed in the Spanish Revival architectural style by Roland Coate. It has been listed on the National Register of Historic Places since March 20, 1986.

References

Houses on the National Register of Historic Places in California
Mission Revival architecture in California
Houses completed in 1927
Houses in Los Angeles County, California